Lajos Ludinszky (born 9 October 1889, date of death unknown) was a Hungarian athlete. He competed in the men's high jump at the 1912 Summer Olympics.

References

1889 births
Year of death missing
Athletes (track and field) at the 1912 Summer Olympics
Hungarian male high jumpers
Olympic athletes of Hungary
Place of birth missing